José Eduardo Cardozo (born 18 April 1959) is a Brazilian lawyer, politician and former Attorney General of Brazil.

He ran unsucessfully for the presidency of the Brazilian Workers' Party in 2009, finishing second behind José Eduardo Dutra.

References

|-

1959 births
Living people
Ministers of Justice of Brazil
20th-century Brazilian lawyers
Workers' Party (Brazil) politicians
People from São Paulo
Pontifical Catholic University of São Paulo alumni
Attorneys General of Brazil